Ernest van Loon (2 February 1921 – 26 June 2009) was a Dutch equestrian. He competed at the 1948 Summer Olympics and the 1952 Summer Olympics.

References

1921 births
2009 deaths
Dutch male equestrians
Olympic equestrians of the Netherlands
Equestrians at the 1948 Summer Olympics
Equestrians at the 1952 Summer Olympics
Sportspeople from Tilburg